Salem is a residential area of Virginia Beach, Virginia located in the southern part of the independent city. The Virginia Beach Sportsplex stadium is located within the community. It is a three-level steel and concrete structure, formerly home to the Virginia Beach Mariners professional soccer team.

Communities in Virginia Beach, Virginia